Hallock may refer to:

Places
In the United States:
 Hallock, Minnesota
 Hallock Township, Minnesota
 Hallock Township, Illinois

Other uses
Hallock (surname)

See also
Halleck (disambiguation)